Terje Moe Gustavsen (20 October 1954 – 4 May 2019) was a Norwegian politician for the Labour Party and a civil servant.

Biography 

He was state secretary to the Prime Minister in 1997, and Minister of Transport and Communications 2000–2001 in the first cabinet Stoltenberg. Among others he became known for sacking the board of directors in the Norwegian State Railways in 2000.

In 2007 he was appointed director of the Norwegian Public Roads Administration. He died of a lung infection on 4 May 2019 at the age of 64.

References

1954 births
2019 deaths
Norwegian state secretaries
Ministers of Transport and Communications of Norway
Labour Party (Norway) politicians
Directors of government agencies of Norway
Directorate of Public Roads people